Milton L. Drewer Jr. (March 10, 1923 – October 17, 2012) was an American football coach and college athletic administrator.  He served as the head football coach and athletic director at the College of William & Mary from 1957 to 1963. His William & Mary Indians football teams compiled a 21–46–2 record.

After leaving William & Mary, Drewer went on to a career in banking. He eventually became CEO of First American Bank of Virginia.  Drewer died on October 17, 2012.

Head coaching record

College

References

1923 births
2012 deaths
Randolph–Macon Yellow Jackets football players
Richmond Spiders football coaches
William & Mary Tribe athletic directors
William & Mary Tribe football coaches
High school football coaches in Virginia
People from Accomack County, Virginia